The 2011 Dalian Aerbin F.C. season is the second season in club history, and the 1st season to compete in China League One.

Overview
Dalian Aerbin signed Aleksandar Stankov, their technical advisor of the previous season, as the manager, and won the league title to gain promotion to the Chinese Super League.

Players

Technical Staff

Competitions

China League One

League table

Matches

Chinese FA Cup

References

Dalian Professional F.C. seasons
Dalian Aerbin F.C.